Little Rock is a former settlement in La Salle County, Illinois. Little Rock was located on the south banks of the Illinois River, just northeast of Oglesby and southeast of LaSalle.

References 

Former populated places in Illinois
Populated places in LaSalle County, Illinois